Henri-Pierre Dall'acqua (born 1 December 1972) is a French rower. He competed in the men's lightweight coxless four event at the 1996 Summer Olympics.

References

1972 births
Living people
French male rowers
Olympic rowers of France
Rowers at the 1996 Summer Olympics
Sportspeople from Toulouse